Eslamabad (also Romanized as Eslāmābād; also known as Eslāmābād-e Balūch) is a village in Jereh Rural District, Jereh and Baladeh District, Kazerun County, Fars Province, Iran. At the 2006 census, its population was 232, in 48 families.

References 

Populated places in Kazerun County